Lieutenant General Stanley Hamer Ford (January 30, 1877 - January 19, 1961) was a senior officer of the United States Army. After serving in numerous conflicts and wars, including World War I, He was commander of the Philippine Department, 1st Infantry Division, Seventh Corps Area, Sixth Corps Area, and the Second Army

Early life
Ford was born on January 30, 1877, in Columbus, Ohio.  Ford graduated from the Ohio State University with a Bachelor of Philosophy degree in 1898, and was a member of the Sigma Alpha Epsilon fraternity.  He was then commissioned as a second lieutenant of Infantry in the United States Army.

Spanish–American War
Ford saw service in Cuba and the Philippines during the Spanish–American War, serving with the 16th Infantry in Cuba and the 25th Infantry in the Philippines.

Post Spanish–American War
After the war he served in a series of staff and command assignments, including Infantry and Quartermaster postings to Jefferson Barracks, Missouri, Washington, D.C., and the installation now known as Fort Drum, New York.

World War I

During World War I, he served as Assistant Chief of Staff of the 84th Infantry Division and Chief of Staff of the 27th Infantry Division. In recognition of his services during the war he was awarded the Army Distinguished Service Medal. The citation for the medal reads:

Post World War I
Ford continued his Army career after the war, completing the General Staff College in 1920.

He served as commander of the 16th Infantry Regiment from 1924 to 1926.

From 1926 to 1930 Ford served as Assistant Chief of Staff of the Army's Military Intelligence Division.

Ford attained the rank of brigadier general in 1930.  In the early 1930s, General Ford served as military attache in Paris, France. He then commanded 1st Brigade 1st Infantry Division. After his brigade command, Ford took command of the Philippine Department.

Ford was promoted to major general in 1936 and successively commanded 1st Infantry Division Seventh Corps Area, Sixth Corps Area, and Second Army simultaneously with Sixth Corps Area.

In October 1938 Ford took command of the Second Army, which was responsible for overseeing U.S. Army organizations in several mid-western and southern states.  On 5 August 1939, he was promoted temporarily to lieutenant general in accordance with "An Act To provide for the rank and title of lieutenant general of the Regular Army."  He was one of the first four active duty officers promoted to lieutenant general since 1918.,

He was a member of the Military Order of Foreign Wars.

World War II

As commander of Second Army Ford oversaw execution of large scale maneuvers and exercises by active Army and National Guard troops that enhanced their readiness in anticipation of fighting in Europe and the Pacific during World War II.

General Ford ended his military career upon reaching mandatory retirement age in January, 1941.

Post military career
During World War II he assisted John F. O'Ryan, the World War I commander of the 27th Infantry Division, during O'Ryan's assignment as New York State's Civil Defense Director.

Personal
General Ford married Lona Pace in 1904. Their son Hamer Pace Ford (1905–1950) graduated from West Point in 1924 and was a career Army officer, attaining the rank of Colonel before his death in Berlin, Germany.  In 1933 General Ford married Katherine Welch of Philadelphia.

Death and interment

General Ford died at the Army's Carlisle Barracks on January 19, 1961, while en route to John F. Kennedy's inaugural. He was buried in Philadelphia's Laurel Hill Cemetery, Section K, Lot 214-SW 1/4.

Awards and decorations
Distinguished Service Medal - in recognition of his superior performance with the 27th Division in World War I.
Spanish Campaign Medal
Philippine Campaign Medal
Cuban Pacification Medal
World War I Victory Medal
American Defense Service Medal
Officer of the French Legion of Honor 
Belgian Croix de Guerre with palm 

In 1940 General Ford received an honorary Doctor of Laws degree from the Ohio State University.

Dates of rank

References

1877 births
1961 deaths
United States Army Infantry Branch personnel
United States military attachés
Military personnel from Ohio
American military personnel of the Spanish–American War
Burials at Laurel Hill Cemetery (Philadelphia)
Chevaliers of the Légion d'honneur
History of the Philippines (1898–1946)
Ohio State University alumni
People from Columbus, Ohio
Recipients of the Croix de guerre (Belgium)
Recipients of the Distinguished Service Medal (US Army)
United States Army generals
United States Army personnel of World War I
United States Army generals of World War II